Bear Creek Township is a township in Sevier County, Arkansas, United States. Its total population was 8,262 as of the 2010 United States Census, an increase of 10.04 percent from 7,508 at the 2000 census.

According to the 2010 Census, Bear Creek Township is located at  (34.053050, -94.293319).

Most of the city of De Queen is located within the township.

References

External links 

Townships in Arkansas
Populated places in Sevier County, Arkansas